Parrega is a village in the municipality Súdwest-Fryslân in the province of Friesland, the Netherlands. It had a population of around 490 in January 2017.

The village is divided by a canal and the only bridge, in the village centre, connects the two parts. Parrega has its own primary school. Most of the children of Parrega, Hieslum and Dedgum are educated at this school. There is also a Community Hall, including sports facilities, called the Gearhing.

History
Parrega was a fishing village, located east of the former Parregaaster Lake, which was reclaimed in 1879. Together with the nearby village of Hieslum it has a more-than-80-year-old Community Society and a 30-year-old village magazine (De Pinfisker).

Before 2011, the village was part of the Wûnseradiel municipality.

Gallery

References

External links

Website of the Parrega school

Súdwest-Fryslân
Populated places in Friesland